The Jazz Version of "How to Succeed in Business Without Really Trying" is a 1962 album by arranger Gary McFarland of songs from the Frank Loesser musical How to Succeed in Business Without Really Trying. The album was McFarland's debut as a main artist.

Track listing
 "How to Succeed In Business Without Really Trying" - 6:11
 "Paris Original" - 3:50
 "Love from a Heart of Gold" - 3:30
 "Grand Old Ivy" - 3:45
 "Brotherhood of Man" - 5:17
 "I Believe In You" - 6:03
 "Grand Old Ivy Part II" - 3:30
 "Happy to Keep His Dinner Warm" - 4:27

All music composed by Frank Loesser.

Personnel
Bernie Glow, Clark Terry, Doc Severinsen, Herb Pomeroy, Joe Newman - trumpet
Willie Dennis, Billy Byers, Bob Brookmeyer - trombone
Oliver Nelson, Al Cohn - tenor saxophone
Sol Schlinger - baritone saxophone
Phil Woods - alto saxophone
Eddie Wasserman - clarinet
Kenny Burrell, Jim Hall - guitar
Hank Jones - piano
Joe Benjamin, George Duvivier - double bass
Osie Johnson, Mel Lewis - drums
Gary McFarland - arranger, Conductor, vibraphone

References

1962 debut albums
Albums arranged by Gary McFarland
Albums conducted by Gary McFarland
Albums produced by Creed Taylor
Gary McFarland albums
Instrumental albums
Verve Records albums